Gedu, also transliterated as Gaedu, is a town in south-western Bhutan. It is located in Chukha District. It is the location of one of the colleges of the Royal University of Bhutan, Gaedu College of Business Studies.

At the 2005 census, its population was 4,288.

Economy 
The economy of Gedu is growing quickly largely due to the Tala Hydroelectric Project Authority (THPA) program which started in 1998 and which has drawn substantial migration to Gedu, with thousands of workers looking for jobs. 

Infrastructure and facilities have increased since the late 1990s to cater for the new population. Before 1997, the town was a village with no telephones or STD facilities.

The plant has a storage capacity of 707,600 litres.

References 

Populated places in Bhutan